Silas J. Seymour (February 21, 1824 - April 24, 1899) was a member of the Wisconsin State Assembly in the USA

Biography
Seymour was born on February 21, 1824, in Pompey, New York. He settled in Dellona, Wisconsin in 1849. On September 23, 1851, Seymour married Mary A. Conine. They had five children. He died on April 24, 1899 at the age of 75.

Career

Seymour had been an unsuccessful candidate for the Assembly in 1861. He was elected to the Assembly from 1876 to 1887. Other positions he held include Town Clerk, Town Superintendent of Schools and Chairman of the Town Board of Supervisors of Dellona; County Supervisor of Sauk County, Wisconsin and justice of the peace. He was a Republican.

References

People from Pompey, New York
People from Sauk County, Wisconsin
Republican Party members of the Wisconsin State Assembly
County supervisors in Wisconsin
City and town clerks
School superintendents in Wisconsin
American justices of the peace
1824 births
1899 deaths
Educators from New York (state)
19th-century American politicians
19th-century American judges
19th-century American educators